Rambergsvallen was a multi-use stadium on Hisingen in Gothenburg, Sweden.  It was used mostly for football matches and served as the home ground of BK Häcken.  The stadium held 7,000 people and was opened August 18, 1935.

References

Football venues in Gothenburg
Athletics (track and field) venues in Sweden
1935 establishments in Sweden
Sports venues completed in 1935